WWE Backstage  is a professional wrestling studio show that was broadcast live every Tuesday night at 11:00 PM EST on FS1. The show was hosted by Renee Paquette and Booker T.

The show premiered on November 5, 2019 with special preview episodes airing on October 15, 2019 and October 25, 2019. On March 13, 2020, filming of the show was halted due to the COVID-19 pandemic. Because of that, the show still aired where Renee and Booker, along with the contributors and guests, discussed the entire issues of WWE from their own homes. The show is also launched the special episodes, where Renee, alongside the contributors and guests, re-watch their own favorite matches from the WWE Network archives called Watch With, which aired exclusively on YouTube. On June 22, 2020, FS1 announced that the show will not be a weekly show anymore and production of the show was suspended. On January 21, 2021, WWE announced a special episode on January 30 about the upcoming Royal Rumble event.

Premise
WWE Backstage was hosted by Renee Paquette and Booker T, who discuss the biggest news and stories in the WWE along with input from other contributors and analysts.

Segments
WWE Backstage featured many recurring segments and bits that are popular to its fans including:
Promo School
The Satin Sheet
Social Media SmackDown
Wrestling With Your Feelings with Rachel Bonnetta
The Main Event

On-air personnel
The on-air personnel featured on WWE Backstage includes:

Hosts 
 Renee Young
 Booker T

Frequent contributors 
 Christian
 Paige
 CM Punk
 Ember Moon
 Mark Henry
 Ryan Satin

References

Fox Sports 1 original programming
2019 American television series debuts
2020 American television series endings
Television series by WWE